Nocardioides terrae is a Gram-positive, strictly aerobic and non-motile bacterium from the genus Nocardioides which has been isolated from forest soil from Changbai Mountain in China. Nocardioides terrae produces the menaquinone MK-8(H4).

References

External links
Type strain of Nocardioides terrae at BacDive -  the Bacterial Diversity Metadatabase	

terrae
Bacteria described in 2009